Zeno (after pre-Socratic Greek philosopher Zeno of Elea) is an imperative procedural programming language designed to be easy to learn and user friendly. Zeno is generic in the sense that it contains most of the essential elements used in other languages to develop real applications.

The Zeno Interpreter was designed for use in Windows 95 and later Microsoft operating systems. The interpreter comes with built-in debugging tools, a source code text editor, and an on-line language reference. 

Zeno was created by Stephen R. Schmitt and is maintained by Abecedarical Systems.

Example: Sieve of Eratosthenes

 const N : int := 5000
 var a : array[N] of boolean
  
 program
  
    var i, j : int 
  
    init_a                          % initialize array
  
    for i := 2...floor ( N/2 ) do
        for j := 2...floor ( N/i ) do
            a[i*j] := false         % mark as not prime
        end for
    end for
    j := 0
    for i := 2...N do               % output results
        if a[i] then                % is prime
            put i : 6 ...
            incr j
            if (j mod 5) = 0 then   % start new line
                put ""
            end if
        end if
    end for
  
 end program
  
 % initialize the array
 procedure init_a
  
    var i : int
    for i := 1...N do
        a[i] := true
    end for
  
 end procedure
  
Sample output

     2     3     5     7    11 
    13    17    19    23    29 
    31    37    41    43    47 
    53    59    61    67    71 
    73    79    83    89    97 
   101   103   107   109   113

External links
Home page
Zeno 1.3 Website

Procedural programming languages
Educational programming languages
Programming languages created in the 20th century